Cointha, also known as Quinta or "Cynthia", suffered martyrdom during the persecutions of Emperor Trajanus Decius. Cointha was martyred by having her feet tied to a horse then being dragged through the streets of Alexandria.

References

249 deaths
Saints from Roman Egypt
3rd-century Christian martyrs
Year of birth unknown